György Barkó (born July 18, 1931) is a  Romanian and Hungarian actor.

Biography
Barkó was born in Purcăreni, Brașov County. In 1950 graduated from the Saint George Szekely Miko Reformed College, the same year successfully auditioned for the Cluj István Szent Gyorgyi Theatre Institute. Since 1954, the Hungarian Theatre of Cluj. Member until 1989, when he settled in Hungary. His wife Julia Bereczky, actress, director (1928-2007).

In the movie - since 1991.

References 

Hungarian male actors
20th-century Hungarian male actors
21st-century Hungarian male actors
People from Brașov County
1931 births
Living people